This is a list of Ceylonese executive councils from its inception on 13 March 1833 until the creation of the Board of Ministers in 1931.

The Executive Council created in British Ceylon by the British colonial administration on the recommendations of the Colebrooke-Cameron Commission along with the Legislative Council of Ceylon as the legislative body.

At its creation the Executive Council was headed by the Governor, along with five members appointed by the Governor. These five members were officials who held the posts of the Colonial Secretary, the Attorney General, the Auditor-General, the Treasurer and the General Officer Commanding, Ceylon. The Council exercised executive power and advised the governor. As a result of the First Manning Reforms three non-officials were elected to the executive council.

Executive Councils

Dissolution
With enactment of the new constitution of the Dominion of Ceylon in 1947 the Board of Ministers was replaced by a National Cabinet.

See also

 Cabinet of Sri Lanka
 List of Sri Lankan cabinets

References

 
Sri Lanka politics-related lists
1833 establishments in Ceylon
1947 disestablishments in Ceylon